Grindelia sublanuginosa is a North American species of flowering plants in the family Asteraceae. It is native to western Mexico, found only in the State of Jalisco.

Flower heads contain 8-21 yellow or yellow-orange ray flowers surrounding numerous small disc flowers. The achenes are distinctive in the genus in being tetragonal.

References

sublanuginosa
Endemic flora of Mexico
Flora of Jalisco
Plants described in 1934